Bulnes is a station on the Line D of the Buenos Aires Underground at the intersection of Avenida Santa Fe and Bulnes Street. The station was opened on 23 February 1940 as part of the extension of Line D from Tribunales to Palermo.

Overview
It is an underground station and is located in neighbourhood of  Palermo in Buenos Aires right beneath the Alto Palermo Shopping Centre; one of the exits from the station lead directly into the mall. In 1997 the station was declared a national historic monument.

Gallery

See also
 Alto Palermo
 Avenida Santa Fe

References

External links

Buenos Aires Underground stations
National Historic Monuments of Argentina
1940 establishments in Argentina